Mansle-les-Fontaines is a commune in the department of Charente in the Nouvelle-Aquitaine region of western France. It was established as a commune nouvelle on 1 January 2023 from the merger of the communes of Mansle and Fontclaireau.

See also 
 Communes of the Charente department

References 

Communes of Charente
Communes nouvelles of Charente
Populated places established in 2023
2023 establishments in France